This is a list of dialing codes used in Italy

Zone 1 - Liguria, Piedmont, and Aosta Valley
 010 – City of Genoa and surroundings
 011 – City of Turin and surroundings
 0122 – Metropolitan City of Turin – Susa Valley area
 0123 – Metropolitan City of Turin – Lanzo Valleys area
 0124 – Metropolitan City of Turin – Rivarolo Canavese and Orco Valley areas
 0125 – Metropolitan City of Turin – Ivrea area
 0131 – Province of Alessandria, including its capital Alessandria
 0141 – Province of Asti, including its capital Asti
 015 – Province of Biella, including its capital Biella
 0161 – Province of Vercelli, including its capital Vercelli
 0163 – Province of Vercelli – Valsesia
 0165 – Aosta Valley – regional capital Aosta and Courmayeur
 0166 – Aosta Valley – Cervinia
 0171 – Province of Cuneo, including its capital Cuneo
 0183 – Province of Imperia, including its capital Imperia
0184 – Province of Imperia – Sanremo
 0185 – Metropolitan City of Genoa, except its capital Genoa
 0187 – Province of La Spezia, including its capital La Spezia and Cinque Terre
 019 – Province of Savona, including its capital Savona

Zone 2 - City of Milan and nearby areas
 02 – City of Milan and surroundings, parts of the Province of Varese and Como

Zone 3 - Eastern Piedmont and Rest of Lombardy
 030 – City of Brescia, Franciacorta, valle Trompia and southern Province
 031 – Province of Como, including its capital Como
 0321 – Province of Novara, including its capital Novara
 0322 – Province of Novara – Borgomanero area
 0324 – Province of Verbano-Cusio-Ossola
 0331 – Province of Varese – Busto Arsizio area
 0332 – Province of Varese, including its capital Varese
 0341 – Province of Lecco, including its capital Lecco
 0342 – Province of Sondrio, including its capital Sondrio
 0343 – Province of Sondrio – area of Chiavenna
 0344 – Province of Como – area of Menaggio
 0345 – Province of Bergamo, except its capital Bergamo
 035 – City of Bergamo and surroundings
 0362 – Province of Monza – area of Seregno
 0363 – Provinces of Bergamo and Cremona
 0364 – Province of Brescia – areas of Valle Camonica and Breno
 0365 – Province of Brescia – Lake Garda and Valle Sabbia, area of Salò)
 0371 – City and Province of Lodi and a few towns in the Metropolitan City of Milan
 0372 – Province of Cremona, including its capital Cremona
 0373 – Province of Cremona – area of Crema
 0375 – Province of Cremona and part of the Province of Mantua
 0376 – Province of Mantua, including its capital Mantua
 0382 – Province of Pavia, including its capital Pavia
 039 – Province of Monza and Brianza, including its capital Monza

Zone 4 – Friuli-Venezia Giulia, Trentino-Alto Adige/Südtirol and Veneto
 040 – City and Province of Trieste
 041 – City of Venice, including landside Mestre area
 0421 – Metropolitan city of Venice – area of San Donà di Piave
 0422 – Province of Treviso, including its capital Treviso
 0423 – Province of Treviso – area of Montebelluna
 0424 – Province of Vicenza – area of Bassano del Grappa
 0425 – Province of Rovigo – area of Rovigo
 0426 – Province of Rovigo – area of Adria
 0429 – Province of Padua – southern end of Euganean Hills and surrounding plains, including Monselice and Este
 0431 – Province of Udine – area of Cervignano del Friuli
 0432 – Province of Udine, including its capital udine
 0434 – Province of Pordenone, including its capital Pordenone
 0438 – Province of Treviso – area of Conegliano, Vittorio Veneto and Pieve di Soligo
 0444 – Province of Vicenza, including provincial capital
 0445 – Province of Vicenza – area of Schio
 045 – Province of Verona, including its capital Verona
 0461 – Province of Trento, including its capital Trento
 0471 – Province of Bolzano, including its capital Bolzano
 0481 – Province of Gorizia, including its capital Gorizia
 049 – Province of Padua, including its capital Padua

Zone 5 - Emilia-Romagna and Tuscany
 050 – City of Pisa and surroundings
 051 – Metropolitan City of Bologna, including its capital Bologna
 0521 – Province of Parma, including its capital Parma
 0522 – Province of Reggio Emilia, including its capital Reggio Emilia
 0523 – Province of Piacenza, including its capital Piacenza
 0532 – Province of Ferrara, including its capital Ferrara
 0535 – Town of Mirandola and surroundings
 0536 – Industrial district of Sassuolo, Formigine, Fiorano Modenese, Maranello and Prigniano sulla Secchia and for the comunità montana (lit. mountain community) of Frignano
 0541 – Province of Rimini
 0543 – Province of Forlì-Cesena - Forlì area
 0544 – Province of Ravenna
 0545 – Province of Ravenna
 0547 – Province of Forlì-Cesena - Cesena area
 0549 – Republic of San Marino (only TIM San Marino landlines)
 055 – City of Florence and surroundings
 0564 – Province of Grosseto, including its capital Grosseto
 0565 – Southernmost part of the Province of Livorno and Isola d'Elba
 0566 – District of Follonica and northernmost part of Province of Grosseto
 0571 – District of Empoli, Province of Florence and part of Province of Pisa
 0572 – District of Montecatini Terme, Province of Pistoia, and Villa Basilica, Province of Lucca
 0573 – Province of Pistoia, including its capital Pistoia
 0574 – Province of Prato, including its capital Prato
 0575 – Province of Arezzo, including its capital Arezzo
 0577 – Province of Siena, including its capital Siena
 0578 – Southernmost part of Province of Siena and the town of Città della Pieve in the Province of Perugia
 0583 – City of Lucca and most of its Province
 0584 – Town of Viareggio and Versilia
 0585 – Province of Massa and Carrara, including its capitals Massa and Carrara
 0586 – Province of Livorno, including its capital Livorno
 0587 – Area of Pontedera and surroundings, Province of Pisa
 0588 – Area of Volterra, Province of Pisa
 059 – Province of Modena, including its capital Modena

Zone 6 - City of Rome, Vatican City and nearby areas
 06 – City of Rome and surroundings, including Vatican City

Zone 7 - Marche, Lazio, Umbria and Sardinia
 070 – Province of Cagliari, including its capital Cagliari
 071 – Province of Ancona, including its capital ancona
 0721 – Province of Pesaro and Urbino, including its capitals Pesaro and Urbino
 0731 – Province of Ancona – area of Jesi
 0732 – Province of Ancona – area of Fabriano
 0733 – Province of Macerata, including its capital Macerata
 0734 – Province of Fermo, including its capital Fermo
 0735 – Province of Ascoli Piceno – area of San Benedetto del Tronto
 0736 – Province of Ascoli Piceno
 0737 – Province of Macerata – area of Camerino
 075 – Province of Perugia
 0761 – Province of Viterbo
 0765 - Province of Rieti – area of Poggio Mirteto
 0771 – Province of Latina – areas of Formia and Fondi
 0773 – Province of Latina
 0774 – Province of Rome – area of Tivoli
 0775 – Province of Frosinone
 0776 – Province of Frosinone – area of Cassino
 0782 – Province of Nuoro – area of Ogliastra
 0783 – Province of Oristano
 0784 – Province of Nuoro
 0789 – Province of Sassari - areas of Olbia and Costa Smeralda
 079 – Province of Sassari, including provincial capital and Alghero

Zone 8 - Abruzzo, Molise, Campania and Apulia
 080 – City of Bari and surroundings
 081 – City of Naples and surroundings
 0823 – Province of Caserta
 0824 – Province of Benevento
 0825 – Province of Avellino
 0831 – Province of Brindisi
 0832 – Province of Lecce
 085 – Province of Pescara
 0861 – Province of Teramo
 0862 – Province of L'Aquila
 0865 – Province of Isernia
 0874 – Province of Campobasso
 0881 – Province of Foggia, including provincial capital
 0882 – Province of Foggia - areas of Apricena, San Giovanni Rotondo and Tremiti isles
 0883 – Province of Barletta-Andria-Trani
 0884 – Province of Foggia - areas of Rodi Garganico, Vieste and Manfredonia
 089 – Province of Salerno

Zone 9 - Calabria, Sicily, Basilicata, rest of Apulia
 0835 - Province of Matera
 090 - Metropolitan City of Messina
 091 - City of Palermo and surroundings
 0921 - Metropolitan City of Palermo
 0931 - Province of Siracusa
 0932 - Province of Ragusa
 0933 - Province of Caltanissetta
 0923 - Province of Trapani
 0922 - Province of Agrigento
 0925 - Province of Agrigento
 0934 - Provinces of Caltanissetta and Enna
 0941 - Novara di Sicilia
 0942 - Province of Messina - area of Taormina
 095 - City of Catania and surroundings
 0961 - Province of Catanzaro
 0962 - Province of Crotone
 0963 - Province of Vibo Valentia
 0965 - Province of Reggio Calabria
 0974 - Province of Salerno
 0975 - Province of Potenza
 099 - Province of Taranto
 0984 - City of Cosenza - area of Cosenza

References
ITU allocations list
The telephone area codes in Italy 
Find an Area Code

See also
Telephone numbers in Italy
Area codes

Italy
 
dialing codes